The Supreme Court of Iran is the highest juridical authority in Iran, established to supervise the correct implementation of laws by courts of justice and consisting of the most prominent judges of the country. The head of the judiciary assigns criteria to ensure uniformity of judicial procedure and to carry out all legal responsibilities.

The hearing of offenses committed by the head of the executive is also one of the functions of this court.

The General Board of the Supreme Court has the right to issue a "vote of judicial precedent", which enjoys the status of law. Judiciary branches of the Supreme Court have the right to hear complaints about lower courts' decisions. The parties involved in the legal proceeding do not appear in court unless the court cites them for explanations. The rulings issued by this court are in the form of annulment and confirmation of lower courts' decisions.

Article 161 of the Constitution of the Islamic Republic of Iran on the Supreme Court states:

Branches of the Supreme Court 

The Supreme Court is headquartered in Tehran and by May–June 2014 (Khordad 1393 SH), it has had 42 branches, of which 5 are in Qom, 3 in Mashhad and the rest are in Tehran. Each branch has two benches (a justice and a judge), and might have a magistrate who may assume the duties of each of the benches if necessary. Only the benches have the right to issue judgments.

The Chief of the Supreme Court 
The chief of the Supreme Court is nominated by the head of the judiciary for a period of five years in consultation with the judges of the Supreme Court. The chief of the Supreme Court must be mujtahid, even-handed and well-versed in judicial matters.

Currently Ahmad Mortazavi Moghadam presides the Supreme Court of Iran.

Duties 
The General Board of the Supreme Court classifies matters given their nature (juridical, criminal, or issuing a vote of Judicial Precedent) into: 
 The General Board of juridical branches consists of the chief of the Supreme Court and the judges of juridical branches and hears affirmed judgments of lower courts in juridical cases.
 The General Board of criminal branches convenes attended by the chief of the Supreme Court and the judges of criminal branches and hears affirmed judgments of lower criminal courts with regard to penal issues. 
 The General Board of Judicial Precedent of the Supreme Court convenes attended by the chief of the court, judges and justices of all juridical and criminal branches in order to ensure uniformity of judicial procedure regarding conflicting judgments and orders issued by branches of this court as well as the conflicting orders of lower courts. The ruling issued by the General Board is binding for all nationwide juridical authorities.

Duties 
 Supervising the correct implementation of laws by courts 
 Ensuring uniformity of judicial procedure
 Serving as appeal authority for orders issued by military courts 1 and important rulings of Public and Islamic Revolutionary Court
 Hearing the charges against the heads of the executive in case of their transgressing Constitutional rules

See also 
 Supreme Court

External links 
 Website of Supreme Court of Iran

Iran
Judiciary of Iran
1911 establishments in Iran
Courts and tribunals established in 1911